Harris Durham Blake (November 3, 1929 – June 9, 2014) was a Republican member of the North Carolina General Assembly representing the state's twenty-second Senate district, which included constituents in Harnett, Lee and Moore counties. He was also the Republican nominee for North Carolina Secretary of State in 2000.

Born in Jackson Springs, North Carolina, Blake went to Elon University. He served on the Moore County, North Carolina School Board. Blake, a real estate agent from Pinehurst, North Carolina, served five terms in the North Carolina state Senate and chose to retire in 2012 and not seek a sixth term. He was deputy President pro tempore of the North Carolina Senate during his final two-year term. He died at his home in Moore County on June 9, 2014 at the age of 84.

References

External links

1929 births
2014 deaths
People from Moore County, North Carolina
Elon University alumni
Businesspeople from North Carolina
Republican Party North Carolina state senators
21st-century American politicians
20th-century American businesspeople